The New York Riptide are a lacrosse team based in Uniondale, New York playing in the National Lacrosse League (NLL). The 2020 season was the team's 1st season in the league. Due to the COVID-19 pandemic, the season was suspended on March 12, 2020. On April 8, the league made a further public statement announcing the cancellation of the remaining games of the 2020 season and that they would be exploring options for playoffs once it was safe to resume play.

Regular season

Current standings

Game log

Cancelled games

Roster

Entry draft
The 2019 NLL Entry Draft took place on September 17, 2019. The Riptide made the following selections:

References

New York Riptide
New York Riptide
New York Riptide